The Henry Covered Bridge near Bartlett, Ohio is a historic covered bridge.  The bridge is on TR61 off OH550 southeast of Bartlett, Ohio, in Washington County, Ohio.  It is a "Multiple Kingpost" truss type, and it is 45 feet long, and was built in 1894.

References

Bridges completed in 1894
Covered bridges in Ohio
King post truss bridges in the United States
Bridges in Washington County, Ohio
Tourist attractions in Washington County, Ohio
Road bridges in Ohio
Wooden bridges in Ohio